Michael De Luca (born August 13, 1965) is an American film studio executive, film producer and screenwriter. The former president of production at both New Line Cinema and DreamWorks, De Luca has been nominated for three Academy Awards for Best Picture. De Luca formerly served as the chairman of the Metro-Goldwyn-Mayer Motion Picture Group and currently serves as a co-chairperson and CEO of Warner Bros. Pictures Group.

Early life
De Luca was born and raised in Brooklyn, New York. His mother was a German-Jewish immigrant, and his father, who was Italian American and Catholic, worked at ConEdison. De Luca began pursuing a career in show business in 1986. Originally tapped to work as a story editor, he rose fairly quickly through the ranks, thanks in part to his mentor, chair and co-founder of New Line Cinema Robert Shaye. De Luca completed his degree from Tisch School of the Arts of New York University in 1995.

Career
In 1990, De Luca made his debut in the film industry as an associate producer on Leatherface: The Texas Chainsaw Massacre III. De Luca has been collecting comics since childhood and is a huge fan of comic books and graphic novels, in particular the works of Frank Miller, and sci-fi properties such as Star Trek.

He wrote the 1994 horror film In the Mouth of Madness, directed by John Carpenter. De Luca co-wrote the story for the 1995 film adaptation of the popular British comic book character Judge Dredd, starring Sylvester Stallone as the eponymous lead. In 1996, De Luca, a self-proclaimed "Trekkie", was approached by the producers Brannon Braga and Ronald D. Moore for Star Trek: Voyager and pitched an idea which turned into an opportunity to write an episode for the series, Threshold.

De Luca is a former President of Production for New Line Cinema. During his tenure at New Line Cinema, he oversaw a variety of films that would come to define the studio, including Seven, Friday, Boogie Nights, Austin Powers, Rush Hour, Blade, American History X, and Magnolia. De Luca wrote and produced Freddy's Dead: The Final Nightmare, the sixth entry in the long-running Nightmare on Elm Street franchise.

After New Line Cinema, De Luca became President of Production at DreamWorks, his tenure lasting from 2001 and 2004.

After his contract with DreamWorks ended, De Luca signed a production deal with Sony Pictures and started his own production company, Michael De Luca Productions. His first release under his production company was Ghost Rider (2007) starring Nicolas Cage, followed by 21 and The Love Guru (both 2008) starring Mike Myers.

He was nominated for the Best Picture Oscar two years in a row for 2010's The Social Network (2010) and Moneyball (2011). He received a third nomination in 2014 for producing Paul Greengrass' Captain Phillips.

De Luca also produced the 2011 remake of the cult classic vampire horror film Fright Night. De Luca and Dana Brunetti reunited for Fifty Shades of Grey, the 2015 film adaptation of the best-selling novel of the same name. It was a massive financial success, becoming one of the highest-grossing R-rated films of all time.

On January 3, 2020, it was announced that De Luca had been appointed Chairman of the MGM Motion Picture Group. In July 2022 he and Pamela Abdy left for Warner Bros. Pictures Group, taking up the roles of co-chairpersons and CEOs.

Personal life
De Luca was previously in a relationship with actress Julianne Moore, star of New Line's Boogie Nights.
In 2009, he married actress Angelique Madrid (born 1974) from Ft. Worth, Texas, who was a contestant on the first season of ABC's The Bachelor. They have a daughter, and a son, Caden (born 2012).

Filmography

Film

Miscellaneous crew

Thanks

Television
TV specials
 89th Academy Awards (2017)
 90th Academy Awards (2018)

Executive producer

Writer

Miscellaneous crew

As an actor

References

External links 
 
 DeLuca Interview at Collider
Variety
DeLuca at Hollywood

1965 births
Living people
American male screenwriters
American television writers
American male television writers
American people of German-Jewish descent
American writers of Italian descent
Film producers from New York (state)
Golden Globe Award-winning producers
Metro-Goldwyn-Mayer executives
Screenwriters from New York (state)
Tisch School of the Arts alumni
Writers from Brooklyn